Jye Bolton (born 3 March 1992) is an Australian rules footballer who plays for Claremont in the West Australian Football League (WAFL).
 He previously played for Werribee in the Victorian Football League (VFL). He is a highly rated midfielder known for his contested ball wins, tough endurance, elite running and determination to win the ball. Bolton has won two Sandover Medals, four Simpson medals and three EB Cook medals whilst being runner up on three occasions also!

Bolton grew up in Geelong, Victoria, and played football for Drysdale Football Club and Leopold Football Club in his early life. He was drafted to Collingwood Football Club as a rookie under Nick Maxwell's high recommendation in the 2011 rookie draft.
 Bolton played in the VFL for Werribee Football Club from 2012 - 2015. During this time, he was named in the Victorian Football League Team of the Year in 2014
 Bolton was also selected to play for a VFL representative side against Ireland in an International rules practice match in 2014.

Bolton then moved to play with the Claremont Football Club in the West Australian Football League competition in 2016. Since then, he has won the Sandover Medal for the best player in the league twice, in 2016 and 2018.

 He was also Runner up in the Sandover medal in 2021. He has  represented Western Australia six times and received the Simpson Medal four times. He twice won it as the best player on the ground in interstate matches, in 2016 against Tasmania, and in 2018 and 2021 against Adelaide, and also in the 2020 WAFL Grand Final, when he was awarded Best on Ground in a losing team. Bolton is only the seventh person to do so, and the first person in thirty- five years to claim the medal in a team that lost by only three points.

He has also won the EB Cook medal for the Claremont Football Club best and fairest player twice. He has been named in the WAFL Team of the Year seven times from 2016 to 2022.

References

Living people
1992 births
Claremont Football Club players
Sandover Medal winners
Werribee Football Club players
Australian rules footballers from Victoria (Australia)